Marindahl Lake is a small lake located north of the city of Volin, South Dakota.

Marindahl Lake, in South Dakotas's Southeast Region, isn't the kind of lake you'll find on lists of the world's greatest lakes. Indeed, you may not be able to find it on any lists of commonly-known lakes. The lake is relatively unknown outside of the immediate area of South Dakota, keeping it uncrowded and a haven for nature lovers. Marindahl Reservoir was created when Clay Creek (a tributary of the Vermillion River) was dammed. The purpose of the reservoir is to provide wildlife habitat and recreational opportunities in the area. The small 139-acre lake boasts a tree-shaded shoreline and areas of 100-foot cliffs towering above the water. Because this is a 'no wake' lake, the quiet waters are ideal for canoeing and kayaking. Recently popularized by canoeists, many canoeing bloggers comment on the shimmer produced as the sun sets across the surface. Marindahl Lake provide a welcome contrast to larger, better-known recreational lakes in the area.

The area of the state that now holds Marindahl Lake saw the Lewis and Clark Expedition pass through on their exploration of the northwestern lands of the Louisiana Purchase. Once the lands of the Yankton Sioux, the area was sold by treaty to the United States government in 1852 and quickly settled by farmers. The two largest cities in the area - Yankton and Sioux Falls - were both plotted by land speculators. Nearby Vermillion maintains a museum dedicated in part to the Lewis and Clark Expedition, as does Yankton. The process of turning the thick prairie sod in order to grow wheat was difficult for the early settlers. Taming the land also degraded the streams and rivers with sediment from run-off. For many years, fishing in the southeastern corner of South Dakota took a backseat to farming. Fishing and wildlife suffered for lack of habitat. Fortunately, modern recognition of the importance of clean water and wildlife habitat caused major investment to be made in restoring the environment to health. Marindahl Lake is a part of that success story.

Because the entire shoreline of Marindahl Lake belongs to the South Dakota Department of Game, Fish and Parks, there is no development directly along the shore. A total of 634 acres of public land is available for recreation and hunting around the lake. The only boat ramp extending into the waters is the Game, Fish and Parks dock near the dam at the south end of the lake. Because of the natural state of the lakeshore, it is easy for a solo paddler to believe himself in undiscovered territory. One may occasionally see another boat, or a fisherman fishing from the shore, but often the visiting paddler has the lake himself. Gliding silently long the shoreline, one is likely to see a variety of waterfowl, small mammals, muskrat, song birds, turtles, herons, terns and an occasional eagle. Deer can occasionally be spotted drinking in the shallows. Feeding fish ripple the still surface of the lake and the occasional bass makes a resounding splash as it rises to snatch a tempting insect in mid-air.
Anglers visit Marindahl Lake to stalk the wily largemouth bass and to take their limit of bluegill, black crappie and green sunfish. Channel Catfish are beginning to reach fish-able numbers and size in the lake. Because the lake was over-populated with common carp and bullhead, the water was chemically treated a few years ago to remove them, and more sought-after fish planted. A stocking program plants fingerlings regularly based on fish population monitoring. In winter, the lake is a favorite for ice fishing.

No facilities other than toilets are provided at the boat access area. There are no camping, picnicking or playground facilities provided. During hunting season, hunters park at the provided road-ends and walk to their chosen spots. The lack of facilities and organized trails keeps the public lands around the lake secluded and seldom used except by serious sportsmen. This seclusion is much appreciated by bird-watcher and wildlife viewers.

Visitors to the lake usually avail themselves of the vacation rentals and hotel-style lodgings near Yankton or Vermillion. Occasionally, cottages may become available around the small towns of Irene, Wakonda, Volin or Gayville. Often those wishing to make a true vacation of a trip to Marindahl Lake take advantage of the campgrounds at the Lewis and Clark Recreation Area just west of Yankton. Here, they can entertain themselves along the Missouri River and Lewis and Clark Lake. All types of water sports are enjoyed here, including larger sailboats and power boating. Real estate is available in the area between Marindahl Lake and Yankton and a ranchette purchase is certainly a possibility.

For the family with children, the entertainment venues available in the Yankton area will keep them busy while the fisher folk of the family make the 20 mile trip to Marindahl Lake. An interesting side-excursion in Yankton is the Dakota Territory Museum, with its full complement of early area settler history, Native American historical facts and information and artifacts from the Lewis and Clark Expedition. The small city has art galleries, theatres, golf courses and even wineries nearby.

See also
List of South Dakota lakes
List of lakes in the United States

Lakes of South Dakota
Bodies of water of Yankton County, South Dakota